Ryan Andrew Speier (born July 24, 1979) is an American former right-handed professional baseball pitcher. He played with the Colorado Rockies for his entire Major League Baseball (MLB) career, from  when he was called up to July 24,  when he was designated for assignment.

Early life

High school
Speier was a standout pitcher at West Springfield High School in Springfield, Virginia along with Joe Saunders and Borchers Ina Vineyard.

College
Speier attended Radford University in Virginia, where he was a standout pitcher for the Highlanders baseball team. In 2001, he played collegiate summer baseball for the Bourne Braves of the Cape Cod Baseball League (CCBL). Speier set a league record with 16 saves, and allowed only 10 hits, one walk, and one earned run in his 20 innings of relief. He was inducted into the CCBL Hall of Fame in 2013. Speier was signed by the Rockies in 2001 as an undrafted free agent.

Professional career

Colorado Rockies
Speier won the Minor League Rolaids Relief Award in 2004 and set the single season saves record for the Texas League (AA) with 37.  He was drafted and remained in the Colorado Rockies organization until the 2010 season.  Speier sports a 3.22 ERA and 1.212 WHIP away from Coors Field and is praised for his ability to keep the ball in the ball park by only allowing four home runs in 99 innings.  He is also a significantly more productive second half pitcher with a 2.38 ERA and 1.28 WHIP during his career with the Colorado Rockies.

Washington Nationals
On December 11, 2009, Speier signed a minor league contract with the Washington Nationals.

Southern Maryland Blue Crabs
He played at Southern Maryland Blue Crabs of Atlantic League in 2010.

Tohoku Rakuten Golden Eagles
On February 16, 2011, Speier signed with Tohoku Rakuten Golden Eagles of the Nippon Professional Baseball (NPB).

On April 12, 2011, Speier made his NPB debut. On November 29, 2011, he became free agent.

References

External links

1979 births
Living people
American expatriate baseball players in Japan
Asheville Tourists players
Baseball players from Kentucky
Bourne Braves players
Colorado Rockies players
Colorado Springs Sky Sox players
Major League Baseball pitchers
Nippon Professional Baseball pitchers
People from Frankfort, Kentucky
Radford Highlanders baseball players
Southern Maryland Blue Crabs players
Tohoku Rakuten Golden Eagles players
Tulsa Drillers players
Casper Rockies players
Grand Canyon Rafters players
Mesa Solar Sox players
Modesto Nuts players
Salem Avalanche players
Visalia Oaks players